Swintonia floribunda is a tree species in the family Anacardiaceae. It can be found in the Andaman Islands, Indo-China and Malesia through to Sumatra.

The Catalogue of Life lists one subspecies: S.  floribunda var. penangiana (King) K.M. Kochummen, which is found in peninsular Malaysia.

References 

floribunda
Flora of Indo-China
Flora of Malesia